CULC may refer to:
 Cambridge Universities Labour Club
 Cambridge University Liberal Club
 Clough Undergraduate Learning Commons, a large academic building at Georgia Tech